Bancarevo is a village situated in Niška Banja municipality in Serbia.

References

Populated places in Nišava District